Connor William Johnson (born 10 March 1998) is an English professional footballer who plays for Peterborough Sports as a central defender.

Club career
Johnson started his youth career with the academy of Northampton Town and later joined the academy of Wolverhampton. While progressing through the youth ranks, he went on to captain the under-23 team. He signed his first professional contract with the club at the beginning of the 2016–17 season.

On 27 March 2017, Johnson was loaned out to Boreham Wood. On 5 September 2017, he was loaned out to AFC Telford United for one month. However, ten days later, he was handed a two-match suspension by the FA for playing an EFL Trophy match against Swansea City in January 2017 despite being ineligible for doing so. In February 2018, he extended his loan till the end of the season.

On 31 August 2018, Johnson was loaned out to League One club Walsall for the entire season. Four days later, he made his debut, starting in a 2–1 victory over Burton Albion in the EFL Trophy.

On 2 September 2019, Johnson signed for Scottish Premiership club Kilmarnock on a season-long loan. His contract with Wolves expired at the end of the season.

On 10 December 2020, Johnson signed for hometown club Kettering Town.

In June 2022, Johnson signed for newly promoted National League North club Peterborough Sports.

Career statistics

Style of play
Johnson plays as a central defender. Sean Parrish (assistant manager of AFC Telford United) said that Johnson has "got a good attitude and he wants to learn, improve and play at a high level".

References

External links

1998 births
Living people
English footballers
Association football defenders
Sportspeople from Kettering
Wolverhampton Wanderers F.C. players
Boreham Wood F.C. players
AFC Telford United players
Walsall F.C. players
Kilmarnock F.C. players
Kettering Town F.C. players
Peterborough Sports F.C. players
English Football League players
National League (English football) players
Scottish Professional Football League players